Cauchas discalis is a moth of the family Adelidae or fairy longhorn moths. It was described by Annette Frances Braun in 1925. It is found in the US state of California.

References

Adelidae
Moths described in 1925
Moths of North America